The SPCA 60T was a French transport seaplane built in the early 1930s. The SPCA 60T had a high-wing monoplane configuration with engines in tandem and all-metal construction.

Specifications

References

Flying boats
SPCA aircraft
High-wing aircraft
Aircraft first flown in 1932